Dave Middendorf (born November 23, 1945) is a former American football guard. He played for the Cincinnati Bengals from 1968 to 1969 and for the New York Jets in 1970.

References

1945 births
Living people
Players of American football from Seattle
American football offensive guards
Washington State Cougars football players
Cincinnati Bengals players
New York Jets players